id Tech 3,  popularly known as the Quake III Arena engine''', is a game engine developed by id Software for their video game Quake III Arena. It has been adopted by numerous games. During its time, it competed with the Unreal Engine; both engines were widely licensed.

While id Tech 3 is based on id Tech 2 engine, a large amount of the code was rewritten. Successor id Tech 4 was derived from id Tech 3, as was Infinity Ward's IW engine used in Call of Duty 2 onwards.

At QuakeCon 2005, John Carmack announced that the id Tech 3 source code would be released under the GNU General Public License v2.0 or later, and it was released on August 19, 2005. Originally distributed by id via FTP, the code can be downloaded from id's GitHub account.

Features
Graphics
Unlike most other game engines released at the time — including its primary competitor, the Unreal Engine, id Tech 3 requires an OpenGL-compliant graphics accelerator to run.  The engine does not include a software renderer.

id Tech 3 introduced spline-based curved surfaces in addition to planar volumes, which are responsible for many of the surfaces present within the game.

Shaders
The graphical technology of the game is based tightly around a "shader" system where the appearance of many surfaces can be defined in text files referred to as "shader scripts."  Shaders are described and rendered as several layers, each layer contains a texture, a "blend mode" which determines how to superimpose it over the previous layer and texture orientation modes such as environment mapping, scrolling, and rotation. These features can readily be seen within the game with many bright and active surfaces in each map and even on character models. The shader system goes beyond visual appearance, defining the contents of volumes (e.g. a water volume is defined by applying a water shader to its surfaces), light emission and which sound to play when a volume is trodden upon. In order to assist calculation of these shaders, id Tech 3 implements a specific fast inverse square root function, which attracted a significant amount of attention in the game development community for its clever use of integer operations.

Video
In-game videos all use a proprietary format called "RoQ", which was originally created by Graeme Devine, the co-designer of Quake 3, for the game The 11th Hour. Internally RoQ uses vector quantization to encode video and DPCM to encode audio. While the format itself is proprietary it was successfully reverse-engineered in 2001, and the actual RoQ decoder is present in the Quake 3 source code release. RoQ has seen little use outside games based on the id Tech 3 or id Tech 4 engines, but is supported by several video players (such as MPlayer) and a handful of third-party encoders exist. One notable exception is the Unreal Engine-based game Postal 2: Apocalypse Weekend, which uses RoQ files for its intro and outro cutscenes, as well as for a joke cutscene that plays after a mission at the end of part one.

Models
id Tech 3 loads 3D models in the MD3 format. The format uses vertex movements (sometimes called per-vertex animation) as opposed to skeletal animation in order to store animation. The animation features in the MD3 format are superior to those in id Tech 2's MD2 format because an animator is able to have a variable number of key frames per second instead of MD2's standard 10 key frames per second. This allows for more complex animations that are less "shaky" than the models found in Quake II.

Another important feature about the MD3 format is that models are broken up into three different parts which are anchored to each other. Typically, this is used to separate the head, torso and legs so that each part can animate independently for the sake of animation blending (i.e. a running animation on the legs, and shooting animation on the torso). Each part of the model has its own set of textures.

The character models are lit and shaded using Gouraud shading while the levels (stored in the BSP format) are lit either with lightmaps or Gouraud shading depending on the user's preference. The engine is able to take colored lights from the lightgrid and apply them to the models, resulting in a lighting quality that was, for its time, very advanced.

In the GPLed version of the source code, most of the code dealing with the MD4 skeletal animation files was missing. It is presumed that id simply never finished the format, although almost all licensees derived their own skeletal animation systems from what was present. Ritual Entertainment did this for use in the game, Heavy Metal: F.A.K.K.², the SDK to which formed the basis of MD4 support completed by someone who used the pseudonym Gongo.

Dynamic shadows
The engine is capable of three different kinds of shadows. One just places a circle with faded edges at the characters' feet, commonly known as the "blob shadow" technique. The other two modes project an accurate polygonal shadow across the floor. The difference between the latter two modes is one's reliance on opaque, solid black shadows while the other mode attempts (with mixed success) to project depth-pass stencil shadow volume shadows in a medium-transparent black. Neither of these techniques clip the shadow volumes, causing the shadows to extend down walls and through geometry.

Other rendering features
Other visual features include volumetric fog, mirrors, portals, decals, and wave-form vertex distortion.

Soundid Tech 3s sound system outputs to two channels using a looping output buffer, mixed from 96 tracks with stereo spatialization and Doppler effect. All of the sound mixing is done within the engine, which can create problems for licensees hoping to implement EAX or surround sound support. Several popular effects such as echoes are also absent.

A major flaw of the sound system is that the mixer is not given its own thread, so if the game stalls for too long (particularly while navigating the menus or connecting to a server), the small output buffer will begin to loop, a very noticeable artifact. This problem was also present in the Doom 3, Quake, and Quake II engines.

Networkingid Tech 3 uses a "snapshot" system to relay information about game "frames" to the client over UDP. The server updates object interaction at a fixed rate independent of the rate clients update the server with their actions and then attempts to send the state of all objects at that moment (the current server frame) to each client. The server attempts to omit as much information as possible about each frame, relaying only differences from the last frame the client confirmed as received (Delta encoding). All data packets are compressed by Huffman coding with static pre-calculated frequency data to reduce bandwidth use even further.Quake 3 also integrated a relatively elaborate cheat-protection system called "pure server."  Any client connecting to a pure server automatically has pure mode enabled, and while pure mode is enabled only files within data packs can be accessed. Clients are disconnected if their data packs fail one of several integrity checks. The cgame.qvm file, with its high potential for cheat-related modification, is subject to additional integrity checks. Developers must manually deactivate pure server to test maps or mods that are not in data packs using the PK3 file format. Later versions supplemented pure server with PunkBuster support, though all the hooks to it are absent from the source code release because PunkBuster is closed source software and including support for it in the source code release would have caused any redistributors/reusers of the code to violate the GPL.

Virtual machineid Tech 3 uses a virtual machine to control object behavior on the server, effects and prediction on the client and the user interface. This presents many advantages as mod authors do not need to worry about crashing the entire game with bad code, clients could show more advanced effects and game menus than was possible in Quake II and the user interface for mods was entirely customizable.

Virtual machine files are developed in ANSI C, using LCC to compile them to a 32-bit RISC pseudo-assembly format. A tool called q3asm then converts them to QVM files, which are multi-segmented files consisting of static data and instructions based on a reduced set of the input opcodes.  Unless operations which require a specific endianness are used, a QVM file will run the same on any platform supported by Quake 3.The virtual machine also contained bytecode compilers for the x86 and PowerPC architectures, executing QVM instructions via an interpreter.

ioquake3

Ioquake3 is a game engine project which aims to build upon the id Tech 3 source code release in order to remove bugs, clean up source code and to add more advanced graphical and audio features via SDL and OpenAL. ioquake3 is also intended to act as a clean base package, upon which other projects may be built. The game engine supports Ogg Vorbis format and video capture of demos in .avi format.

The project was started shortly after the source code release with the goal of creating a bug-free, enhanced open source Quake III engine source code distribution upon which new games and projects can be based. In addition, the project aims to provide an improved environment in which Quake III: Arena, the Team Arena expansion pack and all the popular mods can be played.  Notable features added by the project include builtin VoIP support,  Anaglyph stereo rendering (for viewing with 3D glasses), and numerous security fixes.  A list of some of the features is available on the project's website.

Ioquake3 has been the basis of several game projects based on the id Tech 3 engine, such as OpenArena (mimicking Quake III Arena), Tremulous, Smokin' Guns, Urban Terror, Turtle Arena and World of Padman as well as game engine projects such as efport (a Star Trek: Voyager – Elite Force Holomatch engine recreation project), ioJedi Outcast, ioJedi Academy, ioDoom3 and OpenMoHAA.  The engine and its associated games have been included in several Linux and BSD distributions.

The source code for the Return to Castle Wolfenstein and Wolfenstein: Enemy Territory engines was released under GNU GPL-3.0-or-later on August 12, 2010. The ioquake3 developers announced the start of respective engine projects (iortcw, iowolfet, ET: Legacy) soon after.

The ioquake3 project has also been used in the academic arena as the basis for a variety of research in institutions such as Stanford University's Center for Computer Research in Music and Acoustics (CCRMA), Notre Dame as the foundation for VR research, and Swinburne University of Technology's Centre for Advanced Internet Architectures.
There are even collaborative efforts from researchers at Carnegie Mellon University and the University of Toronto that use ioquake3 as a platform for their published researches.  Students have used ioquake3 as the basis for advanced graphics work for their theses, as well, such as Stephan Reiter's work which has even been noted at the LLVM project due to his synthesis of the ioquake3 engine, ray-tracing rendering technique, and LLVM.

Though the name "ioquake3" is based on Ryan "Icculus" Gordon's site icculus.org, Ryan does not lead the project.  Instead, he maintains a mentor role and provides hosting for the mailing lists and the SVN repository used by the project.

Games using the engine
Games based on the source release
 OpenArena – An open source standalone game based heavily on the Quake III Arena-style deathmatch. The gameplay attempts to emulate Quake III Arena in that the player scores frags to win the game using a variety of different weapons. OpenArena is also capable of running some Quake III Arena based mods such as older versions of Tremulous. OpenArena runs on ioquake3 and version 0.8 has been successfully ported to Android.
 Space Trader – An action/strategy game from HermitWorks Entertainment.
 Smokin' Guns – An open source first person game that intended to be a semi-realistic simulation of the "Old West's" atmosphere. Originally a Quake III Arena modification, it was then ported to the ioquake3 engine in 2009.
 Urban Terror  – A Quake III Arena total conversion mod while designed and released to work with the retail software Quake III Arena, it is also compatible with open source engine alternatives. The gameplay can be compared to Counter-Strike with a larger focus on movement with its parkour features. Urban Terror runs on the ioquake3 engine.
 Tremulous – Tremulous is an open sourced asymmetric alien vs human team based first-person shooter with elements of real time strategy. Each team may construct and defend a base, consisting of essential and support structures which aid the players in some way. Victory for a team is typically done by eliminating enemy spawn structures and remaining players. Tremulous started as a Quake III Arena mod, but on version 1.1 the game was ported over to the ioquake3 engine. It has spawned a successor called Unvanquished, which runs on the Daemon engine.
 World of Padman'' – The game is based on the Padman comic strip for the magazine PlayStation Games, created by the professional cartoon artist Andreas 'ENTE' (German for "Duck") Endres. He also served as a level designer for the game. The current version runs on an enhanced version of the ioquake3 engine.

Games using a proprietary license
Based on id Tech 3

Using id Tech 3 with ÜberTools

See also

 id Tech 4
 List of game engines

References

External links

Original Quake III source code repository (id Tech 3) on idsoftware.com
id's current Quake III source code repository (id Tech 3) on github.com
ioquake3 project page, community continuation

1999 software
Formerly proprietary software
Free game engines
Game engines for Linux
Id Tech
Quake (series)
Virtual reality